The Myanmar Navy is the naval warfare branch of the armed forces of Myanmar. With 24,000 personnel on duty, the navy operates more than 150 vessels. Prior to 1988, the navy was small, and its role in counter-insurgency operations was smaller than those of the army and the air force. The navy has since been expanded to take on a more active role in defense of Myanmar's territorial waters.

History

Pre-independence 

The naval arm of the Royal Armed Forces consisted mainly of shallow draft river boats. Its primary missions were to control the Irrawaddy River, and to protect the ships carrying the army to the front. The major war boats carried up to 30 musketeers and were armed with 6- or 12-pounder cannon. By the mid-18th century, the navy had acquired a few seafaring ships, manned by European and foreign sailors, that were used to transport the troops in Siamese and Arakanese campaigns.

The Arakanese and the Mon, from maritime regions, maintained more seaworthy flotillas than the inland riverborne "navy" of the Royal Burmese Army.

Founding and the Second World War 
Burma separated from India in 1937 and thereafter became responsible for her own local naval defence. It was decided that a naval volunteer reserve force should be formed to implement this responsibility and so provide a local force for the naval administration and defence of the ports and coast of Burma in time of war.

On the recommendation of Vice Admiral Sir James Fownes Somerville, then Commander-in-Chief, East Indies, Lieutenant Commander Kenneth Sidebottom Lyle from Royal Navy was sent to Burma and arrived in Rangoon in June 1939, commissioned to form the volunteer reserve force and to be appointed Naval Office-in-Charge, Rangoon, on the outbreak of war.

On 6 September 1940, Burma Royal Navy Volunteer Reserve was officially formed under the Burma Act XV, 1940. The Burma R.N.V.R was placed under the operational orders of Vice Admiral Sir Herbert Fitzherbert, commanding the Royal Indian Navy, but retains its own identity and its own administration under the Government of Burma.

Burma R.N.V.R, although very small, played an active part in Allied operations against the Japanese during the Second World War. By 1 December 1945, the Royal Navy has been withdrawn and the Burma R.N.V.R assumed all naval responsibilities on the coast and waters of Burma.

Burmese independence

In December 1947, the Union of Burma Navy was formed with 700 men mostly from Burma R.N.V.R. The fleet initially consisted of a small but diverse collection of ships transferred from the Royal Navy under the arrangements made for Burma's independence in January 1948. British Defense Ministry sold with the original 25-pounder guns on naval mountings and Oerlikon 20mm cannons which were reinstalled later.

1950s
In 1950 and 1951, the United States provided 10 coast guard cutters (CGC) under the Mutual Defense Assistance Program (MDAP). The Myanmar Navy played an important part in the government's fight against the ethnic and ideological insurgent groups which threatened the Union Government in its early days. The Myanmar Navy performed both defensive and offensive roles, protecting convoys, carrying supplies, ferrying troops and giving much-needed fire support. It was instrumental in relieving the port city of Moulmein, which was captured by Karen insurgents in 1948, and the Irrawaddy Delta town of Bassein. Although one armed patrol boat defected to the Karen insurgents, throughout the turbulent years of post independence in Myanmar, the navy was largely unopposed and maintained control over Myanmar's crucial inland waterways.

In the late 1950s and early 1960s, the United States sold the Burmese Navy six PGM type coastal patrol craft and seven CGC-type patrol boats. In 1958, Myanmar's Navy took delivery of 10 Y-301-class river gunboats from Yugoslavia, followed by 25 smaller Michao-class patrol craft.

1960s

Efforts were made to produce locally made naval vessels with assistance from Yugoslavia. In 1960, the Myanmar Navy commissioned two  Nawarat-class corvettes. Their armaments include 25-pounder field gun and 40 mm Bofors anti-aircraft gun. Myanmar shipyards also built a number of smaller patrol craft and a number of landing craft. Landing craft and auxiliary ships are usually armed with Oerlikon 20 mm cannons, 40 mm Bofors anti-aircraft guns and heavy machine guns.

1970s
Although it expanded rapidly during the 1950s and 1960s, the navy was unable to keep pace with loss or deterioration of older vessels in the 1970s.  In 1978, the United States provided the Myanmar Navy with six small river patrol craft. A naval replacement program was initiated by BSPP Government in 1979.

1980s 
In 1980, the navy acquired six Carpentaria-class inshore patrol boats from Australia followed by three 128-ton Swift-type coastal patrol boats from Singapore and three 385-ton Ospery-class offshore patrol vessels built in Denmark. In the early 1980s, Burmese naval shipyards built three 128-ton PGM type patrol boats based upon US PGM-class patrol boats. Each boat was armed with two 40 mm Bofors anti-aircraft guns and two 12.7 mm heavy machine guns.

1990s
The Myanmar Navy purchased six missile escort boats and ten submarine chasers from China. Since 1998, the navy has built two  Anawrahta-class corvettes (771 and 772) and four fast attack craft (551-554).

2000s

2008 Naval Clash with Bangladesh
In 2008 a naval encounter took place between the Bangladesh Navy and the Myanmar Navy. The confrontation was a direct result of the Myanmar Navy allowing companies to drill for natural gas and oil in a disputed area of the Bay of Bengal. The confrontation resulted in Bangladesh's favour

May 2008 Cyclone Nargis
As many as 25 Burmese naval ships may have been sunk in the storm caused by Cyclone Nargis in May 2008, while an unknown number of naval personnel and their family members were killed or are listed as missing. The Network for Democracy and Development in Thailand reported that 30 officers and 250 Burmese naval personnel were declared missing, while 25 vessels were destroyed by the cyclone in three naval regional command centres: Panmawaddy Regional Command on Hainggyi Island; Irrawaddy Regional Command; and Danyawaddy Regional Command in Sittwe in Arakan State.

2010s 

As part of international engagement of the US with the Myanmar's armed forces, the  visited Myanmar in early 2013.

In 2014, the Myanmar Navy began its annual 'Sea Shield' combined fleet exercise in the Bay of Bengal and the Andaman Sea. The annual manoeuvres usually involved live-fire exercises by several of the Myanmar Navy's strategic vessels.

The navy participated in the Indian and Myanmar Navy Exercise 2018, held in the Bay of Bengal. On the Burmese side, vessels included the Kyan Sittha-class frigate UMS Sin Phyu Shin (F-14) and offshore patrol vessel UMS Inle and on the Indian side, vessels included anti-submarine warfare corvette INS Kamorta, Shivalik (Project 17)-class frigate INS Sahyadri, and a Type 877EKM Kilo-class submarine, along with one helicopter and two advanced aircraft. In September 2019, Myanmar Navy's UMS Kyan Sittha participated in the first US-Asean Maritime Exercise (AUMX) to improve disaster management and maritime cooperation in the region.

The navy has maintained relationships with regional navies. It has hosted navies from the region such as the Royal Australian Navy, the PLA Navy and the Indian Navy. Likewise, the navy's ships have visited countries in the region including Vietnam, Thailand and Singapore.

Commanders-in-Chief since independence

Commanders of Naval Region Command

Organisation

Administrative and support units

 Naval headquarters, Ministry of Defence (Naypyidaw)
 Naval Shipyard (Yangon)
 Strategic Naval Command (headquarters in Naypyidaw)
 Central Naval Command (Seikkyi)
 Naval Training Command (Seikkyi)
 Central Naval Hydrographic Depot (Yangon)
 Central Naval Diving and Salvage Depot (Yangon)
 Central Naval Engineering Depot (Botataung, Yangon)
 Central Naval Logistic Depot (Yangon)
 Central Naval Communications Depot (Yangon)
 Central Naval Armaments Deport (Seikkyi)

Naval regional commands and bases

 Irrawaddy Regional Command (headquarters in Yangon)
 Thanhklyet Soon Naval Base
 Thanlyin Naval Base
 Thanlyin Naval Base
 Thilawa Naval Base
 Coco Island Base (including Naval Radar Unit)
 Danyawaddy Regional Command (headquarters in Sittwe)
 Kyaukpyu Naval Base
 Thandwe (Sandoway) Naval Base
 No.(71) Submarine Base (Ownchein Island) which was established in 2007. It is near Kyaukphyu SEZ.
 Panmawaddy Regional Command (headquarters on Haigyi Island)
 Mawyawaddy Regional Command (headquarters in Mawlamyine)
 Tanintharyi Regional Command (headquarters in Myeik)
 Zadetkyi Island Naval Base
 Mali (Tavoy) Naval Base
 Palai Island Naval Base
 Kadan Naval Base
 Sakanthit Naval Base
 Lambi Naval Base
 Pearl Island Naval Base
 Zadetkale Naval Base (Radar Unit)

Naval infantry 
The Myanmar Navy formed a naval infantry battalion of 800 men in 1964, and a second battalion in 1967. They battalions traditionally are deployed mainly in the Arakan, Tenasserim, and Irrawaddy delta coastal regions primarily to assist in the army's counter-insurgency operations (COIN).

Navy SEALs
The Myanmar Navy Sea, Air and Land (SEAL) Teams, commonly known as Myanmar Navy SEALs were probably formed in the early 2010s. The Myanmar Navy SEALs are particularly trained for special operation missions such as Hostage rescue, Counter-terrorism and Counter narcotic operations. The selection process and training curriculum is claimed be similar to United States Navy SEAL selection and training.

Naval base air defence force
Previously, Myanmar Naval air defence forces used Bofors 40mm & ZPU-2 AAA for naval bases.

Rank structure

Commissioned officer ranks
The rank insignia of commissioned officers.

Other ranks
The rank insignia of non-commissioned officers and enlisted personnel.

Equipment

Modernisation 
The Myanmar Navy has undertaken a modernisation program since the early 2000s. It has added larger and more advanced ships, mostly by constructing them locally with foreign supplied equipment.

Frigates 

The Myanmar Navy started its modernization program in 2001 in an attempt to replace older ships and equipment. In 2012, the navy took delivery of two Type 053H1-class frigates from China. These two ships were upgraded extensively. Upgrades included the replacing of HY 2 anti-ship missiles by C-802 missiles and installing new sensors. The first indigenous frigate, the Aung Zeya entered service in 2011 and took part in a joint exercise with Indian Navy ships off Visakhapatnam in early 2013. A second ship, Kyan Sittha entered service in 2012 and is the navy's first stealth frigate. The navy plans to build six indigenous frigates; combining Russian, Indian, Chinese, and Western weapons systems. These ships are equipped with Kh-35E anti-ship missiles, OTO Melara 76 mm Super Rapid Cannons, AK-630 6-barrel 30mm close-in weapon system (CIWS) and Chinese ASW rockets and torpedoes. Radars and electronic systems are mainly from Bharat Electronics of India. Myanmar acquired surface-to-air missiles and anti-ship missiles from China for its newly built frigates and OPVs. Myanmar Navy Shipyard built with Chinese assistance in the late 1990s is one of the most modern shipyards in the region. Many Burmese naval engineers underwent shipbuilding training in China and Russia.

Submarines 
In 2020, the navy acquired its first submarine, a Soviet era Sindhughosh/Kilo-class submarine, from India. The former INS Sindhuvir (S58) was refitted by Hindustan Shipyard Limited before the handover. Now renamed UMS Minye Theinkhathu, the submarine is to be used for training. It was first seen publicly on 15 October 2020 as part of a naval fleet exercise (‘Bandoola 2020’). The Indian Navy is going to assist in training Myanmar to operate the submarine effectively.

Others 
Between 2015 and 2017, the Myanmar Navy procured two Super Dvora Mk III patrol boats from Israel. Next, under a US$37.9 million deal signed in March 2017, the Myanmar Navy received the advanced anti-submarine torpedo Shyena units from India. Moreover, the Myanmar Navy acquired a new landing platform dock (LPD) from South Korea in 2019.

Gallery

See also 

 Myanmar Army
 Myanmar Air Force
 Military intelligence of Myanmar
 Myanmar Police Force

References

Further reading 
 )

External links 
 The Naval Institute Guide to Combat Fleets of the World: Their Ships By Eric Wertheim
 pageMyanmar Navy.html - complaints, reviews & rating

Military of Myanmar
Navies by country
 
Defence agencies of Myanmar

ja:ミャンマー海軍艦艇一覧